The following are the association football events of the year 2010 throughout the world.

News
In 2010, the two top-level leagues in the United States both added at least one new team:
 Major League Soccer, which also has one team in Canada and is recognized as the top level of the (men's) sport in that country, added its 16th team, Philadelphia Union, located in the Philadelphia suburb of Chester, Pennsylvania.
 Women's Professional Soccer, which currently has teams only in the United States, added two teams to the six teams returning from its inaugural 2009 season:
 The Atlanta Beat, the new incarnation of a team from the defunct Women's United Soccer Association, who play in the Atlanta suburb of Kennesaw, Georgia.
 Philadelphia Independence, sister team to Philadelphia Union. Due to construction delays at the  new stadium it will eventually share with Union, Independence played their first season in another Philadelphia suburb, West Chester, Pennsylvania.

However, during the 2010 WPS season, another charter team, Saint Louis Athletica, folded, bringing WPS back to the same number of teams it had in the 2009 season. The league also lost its season champions, FC Gold Pride, and the Chicago Red Stars, although it will add an expansion team in Western New York for 2011.

Following the 2010 MLS regular season, the Kansas City Wizards announced a name change to Sporting Kansas City.

Events

Men's national teams

FIFA
11 June – 11 July: 2010 FIFA World Cup in 
  
  
  
 4th: 
14 August – 22 August: 2010 IBSA World Blind Football Championship in 
  
  
  
 4th:

CAF
10 January – 31 January: 2010 African Cup of Nations in 
  
  
  
 4th:

AFC
  Winners: 
  Runners-up: 
  Third place: ,

Women's national teams 
 24 February – 3 March: 2010 Algarve Cup in 
  
  
  
 4th: 
4–21 November 2010: 2010 South American Women's Football Championship in 
 
  
  
 4th:

Women's youth 
July 13 – August 1: 2010 FIFA U-20 Women's World Cup in 
  
  
  
 4th: 
5 September - 25 September: 2010 FIFA U-17 Women's World Cup in 
  
  
  
 4th: 
March 3 - March 17: 2010 South American U-20 Women Championship in 
 
  
  
 4th:

Multi-sports events

Men 
August 12–25: 2010 Summer Youth Olympics in 
  
  
  
 4th: 
November 7–25: 2010 Asian Games in Guangzhou, 
  
  
  
 4th:

Women 
August 12–24: 2010 Summer Youth Olympics in 
  
  
  
 4th: 
November 14–22: 2010 Asian Games in Guangzhou, 
  
  
  
 4th:

Club football

Women

National champions

AFC
 Australia – Sydney FC
 Bahrain – Al-Ahli (Manama)
 Bangladesh – Dhaka Abahani
 Bhutan – Yeedzin FC
 Cambodia – Phnom Penh Crown
 China PR – Shandong Luneng
 Chinese Taipei – Kaohsiung County Taipower FC
 Guam – Quality Distributors
 Hong Kong – South China
 India – Dempo SC
 Indonesia – Arema Indonesia
 Iran – Sepahan
 Iraq – Dohuk FC
 Japan – Nagoya Grampus
 Jordan – Al-Faisaly Amman
 Kuwait – Qadsia SC
 Kyrgyzstan – Dordoi-Dynamo Naryn
 Lebanon – Al Ahed
 Macau – Windsor Arch Ka I
 Malaysia – Selangor FA
 Oman – Al-Suwaiq
 Pakistan – KRL
 Palestine – Jabal Mukabar
 Qatar – Al-Gharafa Doha
 Saudi Arabia – Al-Hilal Riyadh
 Singapore – Etoile FC
 South Korea – FC Seoul
 Syria – Al-Jaish
 Tajikistan – Esteghlal Dushanbe
 Thailand – Muangthong United F.C.
 Turkmenistan – Balkan FK
 UAE – Al Wahda
 Uzbekistan – Bunyodkor Tashkent
 Vietnam – Hà Nội T&T F.C.

CAF
 Algeria – MC Alger
 Angola – Interclube
 Benin – ASPAC FC
 Botswana – Township Rollers FC
 Burkina Faso – ASFA Yennega
 Burundi – Vital'O F.C.
 Cameroon – Cotonsport Garoua
 Cape Verde – Boavista FC
 Central African Republic – Olympic Real de Bangui
 Chad – Tourbillon FC
 Comoros – Elan Club
 Congo – Saint Michel d'Ouenzé
 DR Congo – AS Vita Club
 Djibouti – AS Port
 Egypt – Al-Ahly
 Equatorial Guinea – Deportivo Mongomo
 Eritrea – unknown
 Ethiopia – Saint-George SA
 Gabon – US Bitam
 Gambia – Gambia Ports Authority F.C.
 Ghana – Aduana Stars
 Guinea – Fello Star
 Guinea-Bissau – Sporting Clube de Bissau
 Ivory Coast – ASEC Mimosas
 Kenya – Ulinzi Stars
 Lesotho – Matlama FC
 Liberia – unknown
 Libya – Al Ittihad
 *Madagascar – CNaPS Sport
 Malawi – Silver Strikers F.C.
 Mali – Stade Malien
 Mauritania – CF Cansado
 Mauritius – Pamplemousses SC
 Morocco – Wydad Casablanca
 Mozambique – Liga Muçulmana de Maputo
 Namibia – African Stars F.C.
 Niger – ASFAN
 Nigeria – Enyimba
 Réunion – US Stade Tamponnaise
 Rwanda – APR FC
 São Tomé and Príncipe – GD Sundy
 Senegal – ASC Diaraf
 Seychelles – St Michel United FC
 Sierra Leone – East End Lions F.C.
 Somalia – Gayher FC
 South Africa – Supersport United FC
 Sudan – Al-Hilal (Omdurman)
 Swaziland – Young Buffaloes
 Tanzanian – Simba SC
 Togo – not held
 Tunisia – Espérance Sportive de Tunis
 Ugandan – Bunamwaya SC
 Zambia – ZESCO United F.C.
 Zanzibar – Zanzibar Ocean View F.C.
 Zimbabwe – Motor Action F.C.

CONCACAF

Note: "(A)" means Apertura champion; (B) means Bicentenario champion; "(C)" means Clausura champion.
Note: "(P)" designates the league champion, by winning the playoffs; "(R)" designates the regular season champion.

 Saint Kitts: Newtown United
 Saint Lucia: Roots Alley Ballers
 Saint-Martin: Orleans Attackers
 Saint Vincent and the Grenadines: Avenues United
 Sint Maarten: D & P Connection
 Turks and Caicos Islands: AFC Academy

CONMEBOL
 Argentina – Argentinos Juniors (C); Estudiantes (A)
 Bolivia – Jorge Wilstermann (A); Oriente Petrolero (C)
 Brazil – Fluminense
 Chile – Universidad Católica
 Colombia – Junior (A); Once Caldas (C)
 Ecuador – LDU Quito
 Paraguay – Guaraní (A); Libertad (C)
 Peru – Universidad San Martín
 Uruguay – Peñarol
 Venezuela – Caracas

Note: "(A)" means Apertura champion; "(C)" mean Clausura champion.

OFC
 – ongoing
French Polynesia – AS Tefana
New Caledonia – ongoing
 – Waitakere United

UEFA
 Albania: Dinamo Tirana
 Andorra: FC Santa Coloma
 Armenia: Pyunik Yerevan
 Austria: Red Bull Salzburg
 Azerbaijan: Inter Baku
 Belarus: FC BATE Borisov
 Belgium: Anderlecht
 Bosnia and Herzegovina: FK Željezničar Sarajevo
 Bulgaria: Litex Lovech
 Croatia: Dinamo Zagreb
 Cyprus: Omonia
 Czech Republic: Sparta Prague
 Denmark: Copenhagen
 England: Chelsea
 Estonia: FC Flora Tallinn
 Faroe Islands: HB Thorshavn
 Finland: HJK Helsinki
 France: Marseille
 Georgia: Olimpi Rustavi
 Germany: Bayern Munich
 Greece: Panathinaikos
 Hungary: Debreceni VSC
 Iceland: Breiðablik UBK
 Republic of Ireland: Shamrock Rovers
 Israel: Hapoel Tel Aviv
 Italy: Internazionale
 Kazakhstan: Tobol Kostanay
 Latvia: Skonto Riga
 Lithuania: Ekranas Panevezys
 Luxembourg: Jeunesse Esch
 Macedonia: Renova
 Malta: Birkirkara
 Moldova: Sheriff Tiraspol
 Montenegro: Rudar Pljevlja
 Netherlands: Twente
 Northern Ireland: Linfield
 Norway: Rosenborg Trondheim
 Poland: Lech Poznań
 Portugal: Benfica
 Romania: Cluj
 Russia: FC Zenit Saint Petersburg
 San Marino: Tre Fiori
 Scotland: Rangers
 Serbia: Partizan
 Slovakia: MŠK Žilina
 Slovenia: Koper
 Spain: Barcelona
 Sweden: Malmö FF
 Switzerland: Basel
 Turkey: Bursaspor
 Ukraine: Shakhtar Donetsk
 Wales: The New Saints

Domestic cup winners

AFC 
 Japan
 Emperor's Cup: Kashima Antlers

 Qatar
 Emir of Qatar Cup: Al-Rayyan

 Singapore
 Singapore Cup:   Bangkok Glass

 Thailand
 Thai FA Cup: Chonburi FC

CAF 

  South Africa

Nedbank Cup: Bidvest Wits

CONCACAF
 Canada
 Canadian Championship: Toronto FC

 Suriname

Beker van Suriname: Excelsior

 United States
 U.S. Open Cup: Seattle Sounders FC

CONMEBOL 

  Brazil
 Copa do Brasil: Santos

OFC 

  New Zealand
 Chatham Cup: Miramar Rangers

UEFA 
 England

FA Cup: Chelsea
 League Cup: Manchester United

 France
 Coupe de France: Paris Saint-Germain
 Coupe de la Ligue: Marseille
 Germany
 DFB-Pokal: Bayern Munich
 Greece
 Greek Cup: Panathinaikos
 Italy
 Coppa Italia: Internazionale
 Netherlands
 KNVB Cup: Ajax
 Portugal

Taça de Portugal: Porto
Taça da Liga: Benfica

 Russia
 Russian Cup: Zenit St. Petersburg
 Scotland
 Scottish Cup: Dundee United
 Scottish League Cup: Rangers
 Slovenia
 Slovenian Cup: Maribor
 Spain
 Copa del Rey: Sevilla
 Turkey
 Turkish Cup: Trabzonspor

Deaths

January 

 1 January – Sergio Messen, Chilean midfielder (60)
 1 January – Jean-Pierre Posca, French defender (57)
 3 January - Gus Alexander, Scottish footballer (75)
 7 January – Alex Parker, Scottish defender (74)
 9 January - Améleté Abalo, Togolese football manager (47)
 11 January - Johnny King, English footballer (83)
 13 January - Tommy Sloan, Scottish footballer (84)
 15 January – Detlev Lauscher, German striker (57)
 18 January – Lino Grava, Italian defender (82)
 19 January – Nils Jensen, Danish goalkeeper (74)
 19 January – Panajot Pano, Albanian striker (70)
 19 January - Christos Hatziskoulidis, Greek footballer (57)
 20 January - Jack Parry, Welsh footballer (86)
 21 January – Marino Bergamasco, Italian midfielder (84)
 26 January – Lars Larsson, Swedish defender (76)

February 

 1 February - Bobby Kirk, Scottish footballer (82)
 3 February – Gil Merrick, English goalkeeper (88)
 5 February – Galimzyan Khusainov, Russian striker (72)
 7 February - Bobby Dougan, Scottish footballer (83)
 8 February – Angelo Franzosi, Italian goalkeeper (88)
 9 February – Constant de Backer, Belgian midfielder (81)
 10 February – Orlando, Brazilian defender (74)
 11 February – Brian Godfrey, Welsh striker (69)
 11 February – Yury Sevidov, Russian striker (67)
 12 February – Werner Krämer, German striker (70)
 12 February – Petar Borota, Serbian goalkeeper (57)
 12 February – Luis Molowny, Spanish midfielder and manager (84)
 13 February – Marian Parse, Romanian striker (23, cancer)
 14 February – Zhang Yalin, Chinese midfielder (28, lymphoma)
 February 15 – Juan Carlos González, Uruguayan defender, winner of the 1950 FIFA World Cup. (85)
 16 February – Wan Chi Keung, Hong Kong striker (53)
 18 February - Alan Gordon, Scottish footballer (65)
 20 February - Bobby Cox, Scottish footballer (76)
 22 February - Bobby Smith, Scottish footballer (56)
 23 February – Gerhard Neef, German goalkeeper (63)
 27 February - Charlie Crowe, English footballer (85)
 28 February - Adam Blacklaw, Scottish footballer (72)

March 

 3 March - Keith Alexander, English footballer (53)
 4 March - Tony Richards, English footballer (75)
 6 March - Mansour Amirasefi, Iranian footballer (76)
 6 March - Endurance Idahor, Nigerian footballer (25)
 9 March - Gheorghe Constantin, Romanian footballer (77)
 11 March - Wille MacFarlane, Scottish footballer (79)
 12 March - Aleksandr Minayev, Russian footballer (51)
 12 March - Hugh Robertson, Scottish footballer (70)
 13 March - Édouard Kargu, French footballer (84)
 13 March - Charlie Ashcroft, English footballer (83)
 17 March - Abdellah Blinda, Moroccan footballer (58)
 18 March - Júlio Correia da Silva, Portuguese footballer (90)
 19 March - Bob Curtis, English footballer (60)
 20 March - Naim Kryeziu, Albanian footballer (92)
 27 March - Zbigniew Gut, Polish footballer (60)
 28 March - Derlis Florentín, Paraguayan footballer (26)

April 

 3 April - Oleg Kopayev, Russian footballer (72)
 6 April - Sid Storey, English footballer (90)
 9 April - Zoltán Varga, Hungarian footballer (65)
 10 April - Manfred Reichert, German footballer (69)
 11 April - Hans-Joachim Göring, German footballer (86)
 11 April - Theodor Homann, German footballer (61)
 12 April - Alper Balaban, Turkish footballer (22)
 13 April - Jorge Bontemps, Argentine footballer (32)
 13 April - Charlie Timmins, English footballer (87)
 15 April - Wilhelm Huxhorn, German footballer (54)
 17 April - Alexandru Neagu, Romanian footballer (61)
 21 April - Sammy Baird, Scottish footballer (79)
 21 April - Tony Ingham, English footballer (85)
 21 April - Manfred Kallenbach, German footballer (68)
 22 April - Emilio Álvarez, Uruguayan footballer (71)
 22 April - Victor Nurenberg, Luxembourgian footballer (79)
 22 April - Piet Steenbergen, Dutch footballer (81)
 25 April - Ian Lawther, Northern Irish footballer (70)
 26 April – Alberto Vitoria, Spanish midfielder (54)
 26 April - Yuri Vshivtsev, Russian footballer (70)

May 
 May - Bert Padden, Scottish football referee (born 1932)
 3 May - Denis Obua, Ugandan footballer (62)
 6 May - Guillermo Meza, Mexican footballer (21)
 6 May - Giacomo Neri, Italian footballer (94)
 7 May – Denovan Morales, Honduran midfielder (22)
 11 May 
Brian Gibson, English footballer (82)
Emmanuel Ngobese, South African footballer (29; tuberculosis)
 13 May - Walter Klimmek, German football defender (91)
 15 May - Besian Idrizaj, Austrian footballer (22)
 19 May - Harry Vos, Dutch footballer (63)
 24 May - Kambozia Jamali, Iranian midfielder (71)
 26 May - Leo Canjels, Dutch footballer (77)

June 

 1 June - John Hagart, Scottish footballer (72)
 4 June - Hennadiy Popovych, Ukrainian footballer (37)
 6 June - Mabi de Almeida, Angolan football manager (46)
 7 June - Jorge Ginarte, Argentine footballer (70)
 9 June - Mohamed Sylla, Guinean footballer (39)
 12 June – Mao Mengsuo, Chinese midfielder (20)
 20 June – Lai Sun Cheung, Hong Kong defender (59)
 20 June - Roberto Rosato, Italian footballer (66)
 22 June - Amokrane Oualiken, Algerian footballer (77)
 23 June - Jörg Berger, German footballer (65)
 27 June - Édgar García de Dios, Mexican footballer (32)

July 

 July 1 - Eddie Moussa, Swedish footballer (26)
 July 3 - Colin Gardner, British football manager
 July 3 – Herbert Erhardt, West-German defender, winner of the 1954 FIFA World Cup, listed by the DFB in the top 20 best German defenders of all time. (79)
 July 6 - Alekos Sofianidis, Greek footballer (76)
 July 8 - Guillermo León, Costa Rican footballer
 July 11 - Rudi Strittich, Austrian footballer (88)
 July 13 - Ken Barnes, British footballer (81)
 July 17 - Shaun Mawer, English footballer (50)
 July 17 - Ioannis Stefas, Greek footballer (61)
 July 17 - Gunārs Ulmanis, Latvian footballer (71)
 July 19 - Joseph Aghoghovbia, Nigerian footballer (69)
 July 19 - Daiki Sato, Japanese footballer (21)
 July 28 - Daniel Pettit, English footballer (95)
 July 29 - Alex Wilson, Polish footballer (76)
 July 30 - Stanley Milburn, English footballer (83)
 July 31 - Pedro Dellacha, Argentine footballer (84)

August 

 August 2 - José María Silvero, Argentine footballer (78)
 August 3 - Edmund Zientara, Polish footballer (81)
 August 5 - Yuri Shishlov, Russian footballer (65)
 August 8 - Ken Boyes, English footballer (75)
 August 8 - Massamasso Tchangai, Togolese footballer (32)
 August 10 - Brian Clark, English footballer (67)
 August 10 - Adam Stansfield, English footballer (31)
 August 13 - Panagiotis Bachramis, Greek footballer (34)
 August 22 - Raúl Belén, Argentine footballer (79)
 August 22 – Juan Carlos González, Uruguayan defender, winner of the 1950 FIFA World Cup. (85)
 August 22 - Stjepan Bobek, Yugoslav footballer (86)
 August 27 - Oscar Ntwagae, South African footballer (33)
 August 28 - Isa Bakar, Malaysian footballer (57)
 August 30 - Francisco Varallo, Argentine striker and the last surviving player of the 1930 FIFA World Cup and the final. (100)
 August 30 - Henryk Czapczyk, Polish footballer (88)
 August 30 - Philip Tisson, Saint Lucian footballer (24)

September 

 2 September - Jackie Sinclair, Scottish midfielder (67, cancer)
 3 September - Jose Augusto Torres, Portuguese striker and manager (71, heart failure)
 10 September - Andrei Timoshenko, Russian striker (41)
 10 September - Fridrikh Maryutin, Soviet striker (85)
 11 September - Diego Rodríguez Cano, Uruguayan defender (22, car accident)
 12 September - Nduka Anyanwu, Nigerian defender (30, collapsed on the pitch)
 18 September - Bobby Smith, English striker (77, after a short illness)
 18 September - Øystein Gåre, Norwegian manager (56, after a short illness)
 22 September - Vyacheslav Tsaryov, Russian defender (39, after a short illness)
 23 September - Fernando Riera, Chilean striker and manager (90)
 28 September - Orvin Cabrera, Honduran striker (33, liver cancer)

October 

 1 October - Ian Buxton, English striker (72)
 1 October - Bobby Craig, Scottish footballer (75)
 1 October - Dezső Bundzsák, Hungarian midfielder and manager (82)
 6 October - Norman Christie, Scottish footballer (85)
 9 October - Les Fell, English midfielder (89)
 12 October - José Casas 'Pepín', Spanish goalkeeper (78)
 13 October - Juan Carlos Arteche, Spanish midfielder (53, cancer)
 13 October - Eddie Baily, English striker (85)
 14 October - Malcolm Allison, English defender and manager (83, after a long illness)
 18 October - Mel Hopkins, Welsh defender (75)
 18 October - Hans Hägele, German striker and football agent (70, suicide)
 21 October - Mustapha Anane, Algerian striker (60, after a long illness)
 22 October - Franz Raschid, German midfielder (56, pancreatic cancer)
 24 October - Fritz Grösche, German midfielder and manager (69, cancer)
 26 October - Paul the Octopus, 2010 FIFA World Cup "oracle" (2, natural causes)
 29 October - Ronnie Clayton, English midfielder (76)
 30 October - John Benson, Scottish defender and manager (67, after a short illness)

November 

 3 November - Ron Cockerill, English defender (75)
 8 November - Fred Blankemeijer, Dutch defender (84)
 8 November - Tim Womack, English footballer (76)
 12 November - Jim Farry, Former Chief Executive of the Scottish FA (56, heart attack)
 15 November -Ángel Cabrera, Uruguayan footballer (71)
 16 November - Ilie Savu, Romanian goalkeeper and manager (90)
 November 17 - Olavo Rodrigues Barbosa, Brazilian defender, runner-up at the 1950 FIFA World Cup. (87)
 18 November - Jim Cruickshank, Scottish goalkeeper (69)
 24 November - Valentin Ivakin, Soviet goalkeeper and manager (80)
 26 November - Mohammad Anwar Elahee, Mauritian defender and manager (81)
 27 November - Steve Hill, English footballer (70)
 28 November - Vladimir Maslachenko, Soviet European Nation's Cup winning goalkeeper (74)

December 

 3 December - Jose Ramos Delgado, Argentine defender (75, Alzheimer disease)
 5 December - Shamil Burziyev, Russian defender (25, car accident)
 6 December - Imre Mathesz, Hungarian midfielder (73)
 6 December - Rene Hauss, French defender and manager (82)
 7 December - Federico Vairo, Argentine defender (80, stomach cancer)
 10 December - Marcel Domingo, French goalkeeper and manager (86)
 11 December - Peter Risi, Swiss striker (60, after a long illness)
 12 December - Emmanuel Ogoli, Nigerian defender (21, collapsed on the pitch)
 14 December - Dale Roberts, English goalkeeper (24, suicide)
 17 December - Ralph Coates, English midfielder (64, stroke)
 21 December - Oleksandr Kovalenko, Ukrainian midfielder and referee (34, suicide)
 21 December - Enzo Bearzot, Italian defender and World Cup winning manager (83)
 24 December - Frans de Munck, Dutch goalkeeper (88)
 26 December - Bill Jones, English defender (89)
 27 December - Walter Balmer, Swiss international footballer (born 1948)
 28 December - Jeff Taylor, English footballer (80)
 29 December - Ramón Montesinos, Spanish midfielder (67)
 29 December - Avi Cohen, Israeli defender (54, motorcycle accident)

References 

 
Association football by year